Laurent Voiron (born 18 June 1975) is a French sailor. He competed in the Tornado event at the 2004 Summer Olympics.

References

External links
 

1975 births
Living people
French male sailors (sport)
Olympic sailors of France
Sailors at the 2004 Summer Olympics – Tornado
Sportspeople from Chambéry